Ash Shajar is a village in eastern Yemen. It is located in the Hadhramaut Governorate. The name means "The trees" in Arabic.

External links
Towns and villages in the Hadhramaut Governorate

Populated places in Hadhramaut Governorate